Meryta brachypoda is a species of plant in the family Araliaceae. It is found in French Polynesia and Pitcairn.

References

brachypoda
Critically endangered plants
Flora of the Tubuai Islands
Taxonomy articles created by Polbot